The 2017 season was the Cleveland Browns' 65th in the National Football League (NFL), their 69th overall, their second under head coach Hue Jackson and their second and final season under general manager Sashi Brown. The Browns failed to improve on their 1–15 record from the previous season, as they instead joined the 2008 Detroit Lions as the only teams in NFL history to finish a season 0–16, and the last due to the NFL expanding its regular season schedule to 17 games in 2021. They extended a losing streak that began in the final game of the previous season. The Browns became the twelfth NFL team to have gone winless playing eight games or more and the fourth since the AFL–NFL merger in 1970.

In going 0–16, the Browns became the first franchise in NFL history to have multiple and consecutive seasons with 15 or more losses. They were eliminated from the AFC North title contention in Week 11, extending an active NFL record drought of 25 consecutive seasons without a division title and would subsequently be eliminated from playoff contention the next week, extending their franchise-record playoff drought to 15 consecutive seasons. With the Buffalo Bills qualifying for the postseason for the first time since 1999, the Browns had the longest postseason drought in the NFL and the second longest in the four major American sports leagues, only behind the Seattle Mariners of Major League Baseball (the Mariners would qualify for the MLB playoffs in 2022).

The Browns finished the season with a losing record for the tenth consecutive season, extending a franchise record.  It was the first season in which they lost every home game since 1999. The Browns also extended their road losing streak to 21 games and their losing streak within the division to 17 games, both dating back to the 2015 season.  A Week 13 loss moved the Browns to 1–27 in their first 28 games under Jackson, surpassing the 1976–77 Tampa Bay Buccaneers for the worst 28-game start (2–26) for a regime in NFL history. The Browns finished the 2017 season with combined 1–31 record over the previous two seasons, an NFL record for worst winning percentage over a two season span. After starting 2014 with a 6–3 record heading into Week 11, the Browns would lose 50 of 55 games between that point and the end of this season.

On December 7, Brown was relieved of his duties as executive vice president. John Dorsey, formerly of the Kansas City Chiefs, was hired as general manager the same day. To further add to these failures, offensive tackle Joe Thomas missed the Pro Bowl for the first time in his career, as he tore his left triceps on October 22, ending his season. Before his injury, Thomas had not missed a single snap since joining the league in 2007, a total of 10,363 plays. He then retired on March 14, 2018, following the season.

The season saw the Browns play in London for the first time in franchise history, in a 33–16 loss to the Minnesota Vikings on October 29.

Because the Rams went 11–5, their first winning season in 14 years when they were based in St. Louis, the Browns were the only team from 2008 to this year that did not have a single winning season.

Offseason

Coaching changes
On January 7, the Browns fired defensive coordinator Ray Horton. A day later, they hired Gregg Williams as his replacement. Williams had previously served as the defensive coordinator for the Los Angeles Rams.

On January 9, associate head coach Pep Hamilton left the Browns to become assistant head coach at the University of Michigan. Hamilton was also the Browns' quarterbacks coach.

On January 10, the Browns fired five assistant coaches: offensive line coach Hal Hunter, inside linebackers coach Johnny Holland, outside linebackers coach Ryan Slowik, defensive backs coach Louie Cioffi, and assistant defensive backs coach Cannon Matthews.

On January 13, the Browns hired DeWayne Walker as defensive backs coach. A day later, they hired Blake Williams as linebackers coach, Jerod Kruse as assistant defensive backs coach, and Bob Wylie as offensive line coach.

On January 17, the Browns fired defensive line coach Robert Nunn and hired Clyde Simmons as his replacement.

On February 8, the Browns hired former Buffalo Bills assistant David Lee as their quarterbacks coach.

Roster changes

Free agents

The following players, who played for the Browns in 2016, were eligible for free agency in 2017.

Releases

Signings

* Player was claimed off waivers

Trades

2017 Draft Class

Undrafted Free Agents

Staff

Final roster

Preseason

Regular season

Schedule

Note: Intra-division opponents are in bold text.

Game summaries

Week 1: vs. Pittsburgh Steelers

The Browns dropped their 13th consecutive season-opening game with a 21–18 loss to the Steelers.

The scoring began early in the first quarter when Pittsburgh's Tyler Matakevich blocked a Britton Colquitt punt, knocking the ball into the end zone where it was recovered by Anthony Chickillo for a touchdown. The Browns were able to tie the score by the end of the first quarter, however, as rookie quarterback DeShone Kizer orchestrated a 12-play drive that ended when he scored on a 1-yard touchdown run.

The game stayed at 7–7 through most of the second quarter, until the Steelers quarterback Ben Roethlisberger connected with tight end Jesse James on a 4-yard touchdown with 45 seconds left in the first half. The 7–play, 91-yard scoring drive was highlighted by a 50-yard reception by Antonio Brown on a tipped ball.

After a Zane Gonzalez field goal brought the Browns within 14–10 early in the third quarter, the Steelers drove down the field again. Roethlisberger threw a second touchdown pass to James to put them up by 11, 21–10. The drive was boosted by a 41-yard pass interference penalty on Browns cornerback Jamar Taylor on a deep pass intended for Brown.

The score remained 21–10 until under four minutes remained in the game, when Kizer was able to throw his first career touchdown pass to Corey Coleman. A two–point conversion run by Isaiah Crowell brought the Browns to within a field goal, 21–18.

The Browns did not get a chance to score again, however, as the Steelers were able to run out the clock after a long pass from Roethlisberger to Brown. Browns head coach Hue Jackson challenged the ruling; however, the catch call on the field was upheld.

With their 13th straight season–opening loss, which extended an NFL record, the Browns started 0–1.  The Browns also lost their 12th straight game against a divisional opponent.

Week 2: at Baltimore Ravens

After losing at home, the Browns traveled to Baltimore to play the Ravens.  The Ravens scored the only points of the first quarter when Terrence West ran for a 4-yard touchdown to make it 7–0.  They made it 14–0 in the second quarter when Javorius Allen caught a 9-yard pass from Joe Flacco.  The Browns got on the board when Kevin Hogan found David Njoku on a 23-yard pass to make it 14–7.  The Ravens then moved up by 2 touchdowns at halftime when Flacco found Jeremy Maclin on a 2-yard pass to make it 21–7.  In the third quarter, the Browns drew closer when Zane Gonzalez kicked a 38-yard field goal to make it 21–10.  In the fourth quarter, the Ravens sealed the game with a field goal of their own:  Justin Tucker kicked it from 28 yards out to make the final score 24–10.

With the loss, the Browns fell to 0–2.  Ravens QB Joe Flacco improved to 16–2 against the Browns for his career while the Browns lost their 14th straight road game and 13th straight game against a divisional opponent.

Week 3: at Indianapolis Colts

The Browns were a Vegas road favorite for the first time since 2012 and an overall favorite for the first time since 2015.  The Colts struck first in the first quarter when backup QB Jacoby Brissett ran for a 5-yard touchdown to make the score 7–0 for the quarter's only points.  The Browns managed to tie it up in the second quarter when Duke Johnson Jr. ran for a 19-yard touchdown to make it 7–7.  Though the Colts then responded with 3 straight touchdowns:  Brissett ran for another one from 7 yards out followed up by a 61-yard passing touchdown from him to T.Y. Hilton.  Lastly, the Frank Gore ran for a 4-yard touchdown for lead changes of 14–7, 21–7, and 28–7.  The Browns managed to make the score 28–14 at halftime when DeShone Kizer found David Njoku on a 1-yard pass.  After a scoreless third quarter, the Colts managed to increase their lead when Adam Vinatieri nailed a 33-yard field goal to make it 31–14.  The Browns tried to rally with 2 more touchdowns:  Kizer connected with Kenny Britt on an 11-yard pass to make it 31–21.  This was followed by Kizer running for a touchdown from a yard out to make it 31–28.  The Browns failed to recover the onside kick and it sealed the win for the Colts.

With the loss, the Browns fell to 0–3.

Week 4: vs. Cincinnati Bengals

The Browns then returned for a game against their division rival Bengals in Game 1 of the Battle of Ohio.  After a scoreless first quarter, the Bengals offense exploded in the second quarter with 3 touchdowns:  Dalton threw all 3 when he found A.J. Green on a 7-yard pass, Tyler Kroft on a 3-yard pass, and Giovani Bernard on a 61-yard pass to make the score 7–0, 14–0, and 21–0 at halftime.  In the third quarter, the Bengals increased their lead when Randy Bullock kicked a 41-yard field goal to make it 24–0.  This was followed by Dalton's fourth touchdown pass of the game:  Another one to Kroft from 16 yards out made it 31–0.  The Browns scored their only points of the game in the fourth quarter when Duke Johnson Jr. ran for a 1-yard touchdown to make the final score 31–7.

With the loss, the Browns fell to 0–4 and had sole possession of last place in the AFC North. The loss also was their 14th straight against a divisional opponent.

Week 5: vs. New York Jets

After a horrifying loss, the Browns stayed home for a game against the Jets.  After a scoreless first quarter, the Jets managed to score the first half's only points when Chandler Catanzaro nailed a 57-yard field goal to make it 3–0 at halftime.  The Browns managed to take the lead in the third quarter when Kevin Hogan found David Njoku on a 21-yard pass to make it 7–3.  The Jets however retook the lead later on in the quarter when Josh McCown found Austin Seferian-Jenkins to make it 10–7.  They increased their lead in the fourth quarter when McCown found Jermaine Kearse on a 24-yard pass to make it 17–7.  The Browns came up short when Hogan found Duke Johnson Jr. on a 41-yard pass to make the final score 17–14.  The Browns missed 2 field goals, had 3 turnovers, and were 0/3 in the red zone.

With the loss, the Browns fell to 0–5. They were the only team in the AFC without a victory through five weeks of the season.

Week 6: at Houston Texans

The Browns traveled for a duel against the Texans.  The Texans scored first when Ka'imi Fairbairn kicked a 40-yard field goal to make it 3–0.  The Browns tied the game up when Zane Gonzalez kicked a 41-yard field goal making the score 3–3.  Afterwards, the Texans scored 30 unanswered points:  Later in the first quarter, DeShaun Watson found Will Fuller V on a 39-yard pass to make it 10–3.  In the second quarter, Johnathan Joseph returned an interception 82 yards for a touchdown to make it 16–3 followed up by Watson connecting with Braxton Miller on a 1-yard pass to make it 24–3 at halftime.  In the third quarter, a penalty got enforced on Kevin Hogan in the end zone giving the Texans a safety and increasing their lead to 26–3.  Watson then found DeAndre Hopkins on a 3-yard pass to make it 33–3.  The Browns scored twice in the fourth quarter when Jason McCourty returned an interception 56 yards for a touchdown to make it 33–10.  Finally, Hogan for Seth DeValve on a 3-yard pass to make the final score 33–17.

The Texans routed the Browns, dropping them to 0–6.

Week 7: vs. Tennessee Titans

The Browns then returned home for a game against the Titans.  In a highly defensive battle of no touchdowns, the Titans scored first when Ryan Succop kicked a 41-yard field goal to make it 3–0.  The Browns tied it up when Zane Gonzalez kicked a 31-yard field goal to make it 3–3.  The Titans retook the lead with Succop's 23-yard field goal to make it 6–3 at halftime.  The Browns then tied it up when Zane Gonzalez nailed 47-yard field goal to make it 6–6 for the only points in the third quarter.  The Titans then moved ahead in the fourth quarter after Succop kicked another field goal from 46 yards out to make it 9–6.  The Browns forced overtime when Gonzalez nailed a 54-yard field goal to make it 9–9.  In overtime, the Titans scored the eventual game-winning field goal when Succop nailed it from 47 yards out to make the final score 12–9.

With the loss, the Browns fell to 0–7.  The loss led to the Browns starting 0–7 for only the 4th time in franchise history (1975, 1999, and 2016).  It was the first time in 23 games under Hue Jackson that the Browns failed to score a touchdown.  During the third quarter, ten-time Pro Bowl left tackle Joe Thomas suffered an injury to his arm and was knocked out of the rest of the game, making this the first time since joining the Browns in 2007 that he had missed an offensive play.  The day after the game, it was announced that Thomas had torn his triceps and would likely miss the rest of the season. It turned out to be his last NFL game, as Thomas announced his retirement on March 14, 2018.

Week 8: vs. Minnesota Vikings
NFL London Games

The Browns traveled to London but were considered home team against the Vikings.  They scored first in the first quarter when Isaiah Crowell ran for a 26-yard touchdown to make it 6–0.  The Vikes got on the board when Kai Forbath kicked a 35-yard field goal to make it 6–3.  The Vikings took the lead when Case Keenum found Adam Thielen on an 18-yard pass  to make it 9–3.  DeShone Kizer ran for a 1-yard touchdown to put the Browns back in the lead 13–9.  Though, the Vikes soon followed when Forbath kicked a 34-yard field goal to make it 13–12 at halftime.  In the third quarter, the Vikes retook the lead after Forbath kicked a 43-yard field goal to make it 15–13.  Zane Gonzalez then put up a 23-yard field goal to make it 16–15 in favor of the Browns retaking the lead.  It didn't last long, and the Vikings retook the lead later in the quarter when Jerick McKinnon ran for a 1-yard touchdown to make it 23–16.  In the fourth quarter, the Vikes sealed the game when Keenum found Kyle Rudolph on a 4-yard pass to make it 30–16.  Then Forbath kicked a 51-yard field goal to make the final score 33–16.

With the loss, the Browns went into their bye week 0–8.

Week 10: at Detroit Lions

Coming off of their bye week, the Browns traveled north to take on the Lions.  The Browns scored first when Zane Gonzalez kicked a 23-yard field goal to make it 3–0.  They made it 10–0 when DeShone Kizer found Kenny Britt on a 19-yard touchdown.  The Lions then scored 17 straight points going into the second quarter:  Starting with Matt Prater nailing a 46-yard field goal followed up by Ameer Abdullah running for an 8-yard touchdown, and finally Nevin Lawson returning a fumble 44 yards for a touchdown to take a 17–10 lead into halftime.  In the third quarter, the Browns managed to retake the lead when Isaiah Crowell ran for a 6-yard touchdown followed up by Kizer running for a 1-yard touchdown made it 24–17.  The lead was short-lived, as the Lions tied the game with under a minute to go in the quarter when Matthew Stafford found Theo Reddick on an 8-yard pass to tie the game back up 24–24.  In the fourth quarter, the Lions were able to seal the game with 2 more touchdowns:  Stafford found Eric Ebron on a 29-yard pass to retake the lead 31–24 and then found Golden Tate on a 40-yard pass to make the final score 38–24.

With the loss, the Browns fell to 0–9, clinching a losing record for the 10th consecutive season, extending their franchise record drought. The San Francisco 49ers' win over the New York Giants later that day left the Browns as the only winless team in the NFL through 10 weeks of the season.

Week 11: vs. Jacksonville Jaguars

The Browns returned home after a tough road loss to take on the Jaguars.  The Jags scored first in the first quarter when Blake Bortles found Marcedes Lewis on a 10-yard pass to make it 7–0 for the quarter's only score.  In the second quarter they made it 10–0 when Josh Lambo kicked a 38-yard field goal.  The Browns got on the board when DeShone Kizer found Duke Johnson on a 27-yard pass to make it 10–7 at halftime.  In the second half, it was all Jags after a scoreless third quarter as Lambo nailed a 39-yard field goal to make it 13–7 followed up by Telvin Smith recovering a fumble in the end zone for a touchdown (with a failed 2-point conversion) to make the final score 19–7.  The Browns committed five turnovers, including two interceptions and two lost fumbles from Kizer.

With the loss, the Browns fell to 0–10.  Combined with the Pittsburgh Steelers' victory the Browns were mathematically eliminated from AFC North contention, marking the 25th consecutive season the Browns did not win a division title.

Week 12: at Cincinnati Bengals

The Browns then traveled to take on the Bengals in Game 2 of the Battle of Ohio.  In the first quarter, the Browns took an early 3–0 lead when Zane Gonzalez kicked a 27-yard field goal, although the Bengals responded when Andy Dalton found Tyler Boyd on an 8-yard pass to make it 7–3, Bengals.  In the second quarter, the Bengals increased their lead with 3 field goals kicked by Randy Bullock:  from 31, 49, and 21 yards out, respectively, to make the score 10–3, 13–3, and 16–3.  The Browns made it 16–6 before halftime when Gonzalez kicked a 21-yard field goal.  The Bengals moved further ahead when Dalton found Tyler Kroft on a 1-yard pass to make it 23–6.  The Browns came within 2 touchdowns when Gonzalez kicked his third field goal of the day from 39 yards out to make it 23–9 in the third quarter.  In the fourth quarter, DeShone Kizer ran for a 3-yard touchdown to make it 23–16.  However, it would not prove to be enough, as later on, the Bengals sealed the game when Joe Mixon ran for an 11-yard touchdown.

With the loss, the Browns fell to 0–11 and were eliminated from playoff contention for the 15th consecutive season.

Week 13: at Los Angeles Chargers

The Browns then traveled further west to take on the Chargers, the only team the Browns beat the previous season. After a scoreless first quarter, Travis Coons kicked two field goals for the Chargers, from 21 and 40 yards, for a 6–0 lead.  The Browns countered when DeShone Kizer found David Njoku on a 28-yard pass to make it 7–6.  The Chargers moved back into the lead when Coons kicked his third field goal of the day from 22 yards out to make it 9–7 at halftime.  In the third quarter however, the Chargers managed to increase their lead when Philip Rivers found Keenan Allen on a 7-yard pass to make it 16–7.  This was followed by Coons' fourth field goal, from 27 yards, to put his team up 19–7.  The Browns scored their only points in the half during the fourth quarter when Zane Gonzalez kicked a 35-yard field goal, making the final score 19–10.

With the loss, the Browns fell to 0–12. The loss made the Browns 1–27 in the first 28 games under Jackson and Brown, overtaking the 1976–1977 Buccaneers (2–26) for the worst 28 game start under a head coach and general manager in NFL history.

On December 7, Sashi Brown was fired as general manager.  Hours later, the Browns announced former Kansas City Chiefs general manager John Dorsey as their new general manager.

Week 14: vs. Green Bay Packers

The Browns returned home to take on the Packers and their backup QB Brett Hundley.  In the first quarter, the Packers took an early lead when Hundley found Jamaal Williams on a 30-yard pass to make it 7–0.  The Browns tied the game up later on in the quarter when DeShone Kizer found Josh Gordon on an 18-yard pass to make it 7–7.  In the second quarter, the Browns moved into the lead when Kizer connected with Duke Johnson Jr. on a 7-yard pass to make it 14–7 at halftime.  In the third quarter, the Browns moved ahead by 2 touchdowns when Kizer found Corey Coleman on a 2-yard pass to make it 21–7.  In the fourth quarter however, the Packers managed to tie it up when Jamaal Williams ran for a 1-yard touchdown followed up by Hundley connecting with Davante Adams on a 1-yard pass to make it 21–14 then 21–21 to force overtime.

In overtime, Cleveland won the toss but Kizer threw an interception to Packers rookie safety Josh Jones. Adams later scored on a 25-yard touchdown pass from Hundley to seal a 27–21 Green Bay win.

With the loss, the Browns dropped to 0–13.  They became the first franchise in NFL history to start 0–13 in consecutive seasons.

Week 15: vs. Baltimore Ravens

The Browns then stayed home for their home finale of the season.  The Ravens scored the first quarter's only points when Justin Tucker kicked a 31-yard field goal to make it 3–0.  In the second quarter, the Browns took the lead when Duke Johnson Jr. ran for a 12-yard touchdown to make it 7–3.  The Ravens moved back into the lead when Joe Flacco ran for a 2-yard touchdown followed up by him finding Benjamin Watson on a 33-yard pass to make it 17–7.  Zane Gonzalez got the Browns within a touchdown when he kicked a 45-yard field goal to make it 17–10 at halftime.  In the third quarter, the Ravens scored the second half's only 10 points to eventually seal the game when Brandon Williams recovered a fumble for a 1-yard touchdown to make it 24–10.  Tucker then hit a 43-yard field goal.  The Ravens defeated the Browns 27–10,

With the loss, the Browns fell to 0–14.  The Browns were held winless at home for the first time since 1999. The Browns also started 0–14 in consecutive seasons.

Week 16: at Chicago Bears

The Browns then traveled to Chicago to take on the Bears.  In the first quarter, the Bears scored first when Jordan Howard ran for a 2-yard touchdown (with a failed PAT) to make it 6–0.  In the second quarter, the Browns scored when Zane Gonzalez kicked a 48-yard field goal to make it 6–3 at halftime.  In the third quarter, it was all Bears when Howard ran for a 16-yard touchdown to make it 13–3.  This was followed by Mitchell Trubisky's 4-yard run for a touchdown to make it 20–3.  With the fourth quarter scoreless, this was the final score.

With their 20th consecutive away loss, the Browns fell to 0–15.  They also became the first franchise in NFL history to have multiple and consecutive seasons with 15 or more losses. The loss also secured the #1 overall draft pick for a second straight season. The Browns became the first team since the 1999 and 2000 Browns to have the #1 overall pick in back-to-back drafts, and the first non-expansion team to do so since the 1994 and 1995 Cincinnati Bengals.

Week 17: at Pittsburgh Steelers

In their final hope of averting a winless season, the Browns played their regular season finale against the Pittsburgh Steelers at Heinz Field, whom they had not beaten on the road since 2003. The Browns were competitive throughout the game due to the Steelers resting most of their starters due to already clinching a spot in the playoffs. The Steelers took an early lead in the first quarter when Darrius Heyward-Bey ran for a 29-yard run for a touchdown to make it 7–0. They made it 14–0 in the second quarter when Landry Jones found JuJu Smith-Schuster for a 20-yard pass. The Browns then got on the board when Duke Johnson ran for a 2-yard touchdown to make it 14–7. The game moved back to a 14-point game after Stevan Ridley ran for a 4-yard touchdown to make it 21–7 in the Steelers favor. The Browns then came within 7 when DeShone Kizer found Rashard Higgins on a 56-yard pass to make it 21–14 at halftime.  In the third quarter, the Browns managed to tie the game at 21–21 when Kizer and Higgins connected again on a 5-yard pass. The Steelers retook the lead when Smith-Schuster returned the ensuing kickoff 96 yards for a touchdown to make it 28–21. Zane Gonzalez then got the Browns within 4 with a 51-yard field goal to make it 28–24.

In a highly defensive fourth quarter, the Browns tried to rally a comeback and win. However, on 4th-and-2 with 1:46 left in the game, Browns receiver Corey Coleman dropped a wide open pass from Kizer at the Steelers' 11-yard line, giving the ball back to the Steelers on downs and sealing the Browns' fate.

With the loss, the Browns became the second team in NFL history to finish 0–16 after the 2008 Detroit Lions. Hue Jackson's career record with the Browns fell to 1–31, the worst 32-game record since the league adopted a 16-game schedule in 1978. The Browns tied their franchise record of 17 straight losses. It also was their 21st consecutive road loss, 17th consecutive loss against a divisional opponent, and 14th consecutive loss in Pittsburgh.  The Browns lost 50 of 55 games between Week 10 of the 2014 season and the end of the 2017 season.

Later that afternoon, the Buffalo Bills' win over the Miami Dolphins - coupled with the Cincinnati Bengals win over the Baltimore Ravens - gave the Bills a playoff berth, ending their 17-year playoff drought.  As a result, the Browns held the longest active postseason drought of any NFL team going back to 2002.

2018 Pro Bowl 
Despite the team's historically awful performance, linebacker Joe Schobert was named to the AFC team for the 2018 Pro Bowl. This marked Schobert's first Pro Bowl selection.

Tackle Joe Thomas, who was injured during the season, was not selected for the Pro Bowl for the first and only time of his career.

Aftermath and fan reaction

A parade was held on January 6, 2018 at FirstEnergy Stadium in honor of the Browns' imperfect season and general ineptitude. It was organized by fan Chris McNeil through the contributions of fellow Browns fans and pain reliever manufacturer Excedrin. The parade's route went in the shape of a circle, signifying the number zero. Additionally, the parade organization raised over $17,000 of charitable donations which went to the Cleveland Food Bank.

Having secured the #1 overall pick in the 2018 NFL Draft, the Browns selected quarterback Baker Mayfield. In his first game, Mayfield would help end the Browns' winless streak dating back to Christmas Eve 2016 with a 21–17 win against the New York Jets in Week 3.

Standings

Division

Conference

References

External links

  
 2017 Cleveland Browns at Pro Football Reference (Profootballreference.com)
 2017 Cleveland Browns Statistics at jt-sw.com
 2017 Cleveland Browns Schedule at jt-sw.com
 2017 Cleveland Browns at DatabaseFootball.com  

Cleveland
Cleveland Browns seasons
Cleveland Browns
National Football League winless seasons